The Battle of Las Guásimas (16–20 March 1874) was fought in Camagüey, Cuba. Some 2,050 rebels, commanded by Dominican major general Máximo Gómez, defeated 5,000 Spanish troops with 6 cannons. The five-day battle cost the Spanish 1,037 casualties and the rebels 174 casualties.

References

Guasimas
Guasimas
Las Guasimas 1874